Pingping is an electronic micropayment system available in Belgium which allows users to make cashless purchases via a NFC card or a mobile telephone. PingPing was founded by the Belgian telecom operator Belgacom and the technology was created by Tunz, a mobile payments specialist which Belgacom acquired a 40% stake inPingPing. The system was recently acquired by Alfa-Zet Systems, a cashless payment specialist in Belgium and Holland.

References

External links

Digital currencies